Martha Bradley ( 1740s–1755) was a British cookery book writer. Little is known about her life, except that she worked as a cook for over thirty years in the fashionable spa town of Bath, Somerset.

Bradley's only printed work, The British Housewife, was released as a 42-issue partwork between January and October 1756. It was then released in a two-volume book form in 1758, where is reaches over a thousand pages. It is likely that Bradley was dead before the partwork was published. The book follows the French style of nouvelle cuisine, which makes her different from other female cookery book writers at the time, who focussed on the British or English style of food preparation. The work is well organised and the recipes taken from other authors are amended, suggesting she was a knowledgeable and experienced cook, able to improve on pre-existing dishes.

Because of the length of The British Housewife, it was not reprinted until 1996; as a result, few modern writers have written on Bradley or her work.

Life

Little is known about the life of Martha Bradley, and what there is has come from her single publication, The British Housewife. In the 1740s she worked as a professional cook in the fashionable spa town of Bath, Somerset, and had over thirty years experience in the job. The publisher of The British Housewife noted that all Bradley's papers had been stored with him; the food historian Gilly Lehmann considers this shows Bradley was dead by the time the work was published in the late 1750s. Included in the papers were a handwritten family recipe collection.

Given the recipes shown in her work, Bradley had read several contemporary cookery books, including Mary Eales (Mrs Mary Eales's Receipts, 1718), Patrick Lamb (Royal Cookery, 1726—the third edition), Vincent La Chapelle (The Modern Cook, 1733) and Hannah Glasse (The Art of Cookery Made Plain and Easy, 1747). These had all been changed and improved from the originals, showing she had been knowledgeable and able in her chosen career, according to the food writer Alan Davidson.

The British Housewife was first published as a partwork in 42 weekly editions, possibly the first cookery book issued in this manner; the first issue was on 10 January 1756. The weekly editions comprised "four large half-sheets of printing" costing 3d. The weekly editions would have finished in October that year, and would have cost 10s. 6d in total. The partworks were advertised across Britain, including Oxford, Leeds, Manchester and Sussex. In the text of the partworks Bradley would advertise the other issues, telling readers "We have in our preceding Numbers given the Cook so ample Instruction for the roasting of all plain Joints of Meat ... that she cannot be at a loss in any of them". Petits Propos Culinaires considers that Bradley's "scheme for the education of the cook and housewife was more thorough than any that had gone before."

The work was published in book form in 1758; its two volumes comprised over 1,200 pages. Some works show differing dates. Virginia Maclean's 1981 history A Short-Title Catalogue of Household and Cookery Books Published in the English Tongue, 1701–1800, put the publication date at 1760, while Arnold Oxford's 1913 work English Cookery Books to the Year 1850 listed it as c.1770 with 752 pages.

The British Housewife (1758)

The title page of book version of The British Housewife, published in 1758, outlines that the work contains information on cookery, pastry, puddings, preserves, pickles, fricassees, ragouts, soups, sauces, jellies, tarts, cakes, creams, custards, candies, dried fruits, sweetmeats, wines, cordials and distilled spirits. The book also contained a chapter on cures for common ailments, which included a recipe that included powdered earthworm to cure ague. The work was divided up into monthly sections, and showed a "sophisticated organisation", according to Davidson.

Bradley described her aim for the book thus, "Our cook will be able to shew that an English Girl, properly instructed at first, can equal the best French Gentleman in everything but Expence." She was one of the very female cookery book writers in eighteenth-century England to write in support of the French style of nouvelle cuisine, although she was also happy to criticise the approach for some dishes. At the end of a recipe for roast capon with herbs, she advises that adding a "raggoo" (a sauce) will make it more fashionable, but not improve it:

The French, who never know when to stop, serve up a Capon done in this Manner with a rich Raggoo about it, but this is Confusion, and the Taste of one Thing destroys that of another. They who would be at the Top of the French Taste may serve it in this Manner, but with Gravy it is a very delicate and fine Dish, and no Way extravagant in the Expence.

The French were not the only nation to face criticism; one recipe for roast pork discusses Teutonic animal husbandry practices: "The Germans whip him to Death, but they deserve the same Fate for their Cruelty; there is no Occasion for such Barbarity to make a dainty Dish".

The British Housewife contains several illustrations throughout, including examples of how to truss cuts of game, and examples of menus to have at various times through the year. The frontispiece of the book shows three women working in a kitchen above the motto "Behold you fair, united in this book. The frugal housewife and the experienced cook." Economy and practicality are shown throughout her approach, according to the food historian Ivan Day.

The scale of the book—at over 1,000 pages—ensured the work was not reprinted until 1996, which meant it fell out of public knowledge and few modern writers have written on Bradley or her work. Davidson, who considers The British Housewife "the most interesting of the 18th century English cookery books", thinks "one has the feeling in reading ... [Bradley's] work that here is a real person, communicating effectively with us across the centuries". Lehmann opines that Bradley's personal involvement in developing the recipes stands out in the book. Lehmann, writing in the Dictionary of National Biography considers that

Bradley is one of the most important cookery writers of the eighteenth century, not only because her book is one of the most comprehensive of its kind but also because she discusses the merits and difficulties of the dishes, gives information on European as well as English cookery.

Notes and references

Notes

References

Sources

 
 
 
 
 
 
 
 
 
 
 
 
 
 
 
 
 
 
 
 
 

18th-century English women writers
18th-century English writers
English food writers
English non-fiction writers
Place of birth missing
Place of death missing
Women cookbook writers
People from Bath, Somerset
English chefs
Chefs of French cuisine
Women chefs